Richard O'Connell (December 14, 1949 – February 28, 2004) was an American Thoroughbred horse racing trainer who was voted Trainer of the Year three times by New York Thoroughbred Breeders, Inc. (NYTB).

A native of Brooklyn, New York, Richard O'Connell most notably trained the filly Capades plus the colt  Thunder Rumble who in 1992 became the first New York-bred horse in one hundred and twenty-five years to win the prestigious Travers Stakes and for whom the New York Stallion Series Thunder Rumble Stakes is named.

Following a lengthy illness, Richard O'Connell died at age 54 on February 28, 2004.

References

1949 births
2004 deaths
American horse trainers
People from Brooklyn